Jesse (Iese), also known by his Muslim names Ali-Quli Khan and Mustafa Pasha, (1680 or 1681–1727), of the Mukhranian Bagrationi dynasty, was a king of Kartli (Georgia), acting actually as a Safavid Persian and later Ottoman viceroy (wali) from 1714 to 1716 and from 1724 until his death, respectively.

Background
He was a son of Prince Levan by his second wife, Tinatin Avalishvili. Jesse accompanied his father during his service in Persia where he was raised at the Safavid court, converted to Islam and took the name of Ali-Quli Khan. He held several high positions along the eastern frontiers of the empire and fought, from 1705 to 1714, under his uncle Gurgin Khan and later his brother Kai Khosraw against the Afghan rebels. He was appointed a naib of Kerman (1708–1709), beylerbey of Kerman (170j9–1711), and finally a tupchi-bashi (general in charge of artillery) of the Persian armies (1711–1714).

First reign
In March 1714, he was confirmed a wali/king of Kartli in place of his brother Vakhtang VI, who had refused to accept Islam. On ascending to the throne, Ali Quli-Khan allied with another Georgian ruler, David II of Kakheti (Imamquli-Khan), to repel the attacks from the marauding Dagestani clans but his own position was shattered by a noble opposition. He proved to be incompetent and addicted to alcohol. Unable to maintain order in his possessions, he was replaced, in June 1716, by Shah Husayn with his brother Vakhtang, who had finally agreed to renounce Christianity.

Prison and conversions
Ali fled to Telavi, Kakheti, but was surrendered to Vakhtang's son Bakar, regent of Kartli. He was put under arrest at Tbilisi, where he reconverted to Christianity. Released in 1721 by Vakhtang VI, he was granted Mukhrani in possession and appointed mdivanbeg (chief justice) of Kartli. When Constantine II of Kakheti (Mahmad Quli-Khan) moved with a Persian army to remove Vakhtang from the position in 1723, Jesse defected to the approaching Ottoman army, became Sunni Muslim and was restored as king of Kartli under the name of Mustapha Pasha. His power, however, was largely nominal and the government was actually run by a Turkish commander. Mustapha remained loyal to the Sublime Porte when the Georgians staged an abortive uprising in 1724. However, the Ottomans abolished the kingdom of Kartli on his death in 1727, imposing their direct administration.

Family
Jesse was married twice, also keeping more than one concubine. He first married, in 1712, Princess Mariam (fl. 1692–1767), daughter of Prince Erasti Qaplanishvili-Orbeliani, whom he forcibly took from her first husband, his relative Prince Kaikhosro Amirejibi. The seasoned ex-queen Mariam, with her grandson Dimitri, followed the wave of emigration of the Georgian nobility to the Russian Empire and arrived in Astrakhan in 1765, but she was ordered to stay in that provincial city on account of her being a Roman Catholic and allegedly not a lawful wife of Jesse until Afanasy Bagration, Jesse's brother and a general in the Russian service, was able to secure for her the right to join her relatives in Moscow.    

In 1715, Jesse married his second wife, Princess Elene-Begum (1687 – 27 April 1750), a daughter of King Erekle I of Kakheti, who eventually retired to a monastery under the name of Elizabeth. 

Jesse fathered eleven children:

 Prince Aleksandre (Ishaq Beg) (c. 1705–1773) was born in Safavid Iran as a Muslim, and was called Ishaq Beg.
 Prince Alexander, as the firstborn son of his father King Jesse of Kartli, was selected as crown prince and heir to the throne of the Kingdom of Kartli by his father and by the Persians. Because of this, from 1743 to 1744, Prince Alexander worked as the governor of Kartli (1743–1744) and he also served as a lieutenant (janisin) of Kartli, then under the Iranian sway, all as part of his training to become King of the Kingdom of Kartli. After his father's death, he was threatened with death by the Kakhetian branch of the Bagrationi from the Kingdom of Kakheti. He was soon removed from the office by his cousin Teimuraz II, of the rival Bagrationi branch from Kakheti, who became king of Kartli in 1744. Prince Alexander Ishaq Beg joined the opposition faction led by his jealous half-brother Abdullah Beg who was also a pretender to the throne, yet despite their differences, they united their forces to try to save the kingdom together, but soon they both had to submit to the ascending power of the Kakhetian Bagrationi. The Bagrationi of Kakheti and the Bagrationi of Mukhrani waged a twenty year war over the right to rule the Kingdom of Kartli. The Bagrationi of Mukhrani, who were trying to save Prince Alexander and have him inherit his rightful place as King of the Kingdom of Kartli, took the title of regents but never took that of king in honour of his father King Jesse of Kartli, the last true King of Kartli. Ultimately, the Kakhetian branch won and overthrew both Prince Alexander and all of the members of the Royal House of Mukhrani, taking the Kingdom of Kartli and turning it into the Kingdom of Kartli-Kakheti. In 1750, Prince Ishag Beg converted to Christianity, was baptized with the name Alexander by which he will be remembered throughout the centuries, and received a fief in Kvemo Kartli. Soon, his relations with Teimuraz again went downhill even further and under constant death threats from the Kakhetian branch, Alexander was forced to escape to Russia in 1759 as a form of exile. He entered the Russian military service and first joined a garrison at Astrakhan and then, in 1761, the Georgian squadron in Kizlyar in the ranks of podpolkovnik. Prince Alexander escaped to Russia, where he spent the rest of his days. He was a grandfather of Pyotr Bagration, a Russian general of the Napoleonic Wars, and heir to the lost throne of the Kingdom of Kartli, later granted the title of Knyaz by the Imperial Royal House of Russia, and recognised by Napoleon Bonaparte as one of the best Russian generals of his time with the phrase "Russia has no good generals. The only exception is Bagration".
 Prince Archil (Abdullah Beg) (1713–1762), born of a concubine, and jealous of his older brother Prince Alexander, he competed against him as a claimant to the kingship of Kartli in the 1740s, but ultimately lost. 
 Prince David (fl. 1716–1738), born of Elene. 
 Prince Nikoloz, born of Elene.
 Prince Ioane (died 1717), born of Elene.
 Princess Khoreshan (died 1754), born of Elene.  
 Princess Anastasia (died 1731), born of Elene.
 Prince Teimuraz (1720–1788), born of Elene, Catholicos-Patriarch of Georgia as Anton I (1744–1755, 1764–1788).
 Prince Levan (Husayn Beg) (fl. 1748–1758), born of a concubine.
 An anonymous daughter, born of a concubine.

References

Sources
D.M. Lang's biography of Ali-Quli Khan in Encyclopaedia Iranica.
 

1680s births
1727 deaths
House of Mukhrani
Safavid appointed kings of Kartli
Muslims from Georgia (country)
Converts to Islam from Eastern Orthodoxy
Former Georgian Orthodox Christians
Converts to Eastern Orthodoxy from Shia Islam
Safavid generals
Safavid governors of Kerman
Ottoman governors of Georgia
Iranian people of Georgian descent
Georgians from the Ottoman Empire
Tupchi-bashi
17th-century people of Safavid Iran
18th-century people of Safavid Iran